Joey Keane (born July 2, 1999) is an American professional ice hockey defenseman currently playing for HC Spartak Moscow in the Kontinental Hockey League (KHL). He was picked by the New York Rangers in the third round (88th overall) of the 2018 NHL Entry Draft.

Playing career
Keane started his junior hockey career for the Barrie Colts of the Ontario Hockey League.  He played for Barrie for 2 1/2 seasons and was traded to the London Knights partway through his final junior season of 2018–19.  He was selected to the OHL Third All-Star Team for Barrie for the 2017–18 season.

He made his professional debut for the Hartford Wolf Pack of the American Hockey League (AHL) in the 2019–20 season.  As an AHL rookie he was selected for the 2020 AHL All-Star Challenge.  He was called up to the Rangers on February 14, 2020 after posting 8 goals and 20 assists in 48 games with Hartford.  He was returned to Hartford after not playing in the Rangers' game that day. On February 18, 2020, Keane was traded to the Carolina Hurricanes in exchange for Julien Gauthier.

As a restricted free agent at the conclusion of his contract with the Hurricanes, Keane opted to move abroad in agreeing to a one-year contract for the 2022–23 season with Russian club, HC Spartak Moscow of the KHL, on July 25, 2022.

Career statistics

Regular season and playoffs

International

Awards and honors

References

External links
 

1999 births
Living people
American men's ice hockey defensemen
Barrie Colts players
Carolina Hurricanes players
Charlotte Checkers (2010–) players
Chicago Wolves players
Dubuque Fighting Saints players
Hartford Wolf Pack players
Ice hockey people from Chicago
London Knights players
New York Rangers draft picks
HC Spartak Moscow players